Franz Stöhr (born 19 November 1879 in Veliká Ves (Chomutov District) – died 13 November 1938 in Schneidemühl) was a German politician with the Nazi Party.

Stöhr was a Sudeten German who had been active in anti-semitic politics before the First World War.

Stöhr was elected member of the Reichstag for Thuringia in May 1924 and retaining his seat until his death. Stöhr began as a member of the German Völkisch Freedom Party (DVFP) and was elected as part of the National Socialist Freedom Movement, an electoral pact between this group and the Nazis. However, in May 1927 Ernst Graf zu Reventlow split from the DVFP after becoming a strong admirer of Adolf Hitler and Stöhr joined the likes of Christian Mergenthaler and Wilhelm Kube in following Reventlow into the Nazi Party.

He was also a leading figure in the Deutschnationaler Handlungsgehilfen-Verband, a völkisch and anti-Semitic trade union for white-collar workers, close links with which had been cultivated by Gregor Strasser in the early 1930s. He was a shop-assistant by profession and thus of the petit-bourgeois stock that made up the bulk of Nazi Party support in the 1920s.

References

1879 births
1938 deaths
German nationalists
Nazi Party politicians
German Völkisch Freedom Party politicians
Members of the Reichstag of the Weimar Republic
Members of the Reichstag of Nazi Germany
National Socialist Freedom Movement politicians